Hydros may refer to:

 HYDROS (Hydrosphere State), a planned satellite mission and predecessor of the Soil Moisture Active Passive satellite, providing measurements of soil-moisture and freeze thaw state
 Hydros, a fictional ocean planet in The Face of the Waters by Robert Silverberg

See also 
 Hydrus (disambiguation)